Persona 4: The Animation is an anime television series based on the Persona 4 video game by Atlus. Produced by AIC A.S.T.A. and directed by Seiji Kishi, the series revolves around Yu Narukami, a second year high school student from a city who moves to Inaba to live for a year with his uncle and cousin. After acquiring a mysterious power called "Persona", he embarks on a journey with his new friends to uncover the truth behind a bizarre series of murders involving the distorted TV World, as well as a phenomenon called the "Midnight Channel". The 25-episodes series aired on MBS between October 6, 2011 and March 29, 2012. An additional 26th episode, featuring the story's true ending, was released on the 10th DVD/BD volume on August 22, 2013. Sentai Filmworks licensed the series in North America, simulcasting it on Anime Network as it aired and releasing the series on DVD and Blu-ray in two collective volumes on September 18, 2012 and January 15, 2013 respectively. A film recap of the series, titled Persona 4: The Animation -The Factor of Hope-, was released in Japanese theaters on June 9, 2012, featuring a condensed version of the story and new scenes of animation.

The main opening themes for the series are "sky's the limit" by Shihoko Hirata for episodes 1-8, 10-12, and "key plus words" sung by Hirata featuring Yumi Kawamura for episodes 13-14, 16-22. Additional opening themes include "Pursuing My True Self" by Hirata for the TV broadcast of the first episode, "True Story" by Rie Kugimiya (as Rise Kujikawa) for episode 9, and "Burn My Dread" by Kawamura for episode 15. Additional ending themes include  by Yui Horie (as Loveline) for episode 13,  by Hirata for episode 18, and "Never More" by Hirata for episode 25 and the True End episode.

Episode list

Home media
Aniplex started collecting the series in DVD and Blu-ray volumes starting on November 23, 2011. Limited edition versions of the Blu-ray and DVD releases include bonus CDs of the theme music, the soundtrack, and drama CDs. Aniplex also offers a special bulk buying option for the first three volumes through their digital retailers that includes an additional bonus CD of music not found on the first three volumes' bonus CDs. A special two-sided poster was given to people who reserved a copy of either the DVD or Blu-ray versions of volume 6 when purchased from specific retailers. Both the Blu-ray and DVD releases of Volume 10 also include a bonus disc featuring the compilation feature film "Persona 4: The Factor of Hope". With the release of Volume 10, there is a special bulk buying option to purchase all the Volumes with a box to house all of the discs, with the artwork designed by Shigenori Soejima.

 These episodes are director's cuts, rather than the versions shown in the television broadcast.

See also
List of Persona 4: The Golden Animation episodes - 2014 retelling of the series by A-1 Pictures based on the game's updated port

References
General

Specific

External links

 

Persona (series)
Persona 4: The Animation